Meat on Charcoals (Hebrew: בשר על גבי גחלים) is a lost work about Jewish Halakha, quoted since as early as the 11th century.

There are some dozens quotes from it, some in printed books and some still in manuscript.

The origin of the name is the Talmud, talking about the Takkanah of Bishul Yisrael. "If Yisrael have put meat on charcoals and goy came and turned it over - Kosher."

Yaakov ben Moshe Levi Moelin wrote: "One book is called meat on charcoals because what's written in it has sense and taste like meat grilled on charcoals".

Chaim Yosef David Azulai wrote: "And this book was called so because it has taste like meat on coals".
 
The identity of the author is unknown. In one manuscript, "The Big Mordechay Notes", it was attributed to a rabbi named "Rav Bibi Gaon".

There was another rabbi with a similar name, Rav Bibi HaLevi, a gaon in Sura between 777 and 788, but the book cites later Geonim like Natronai ben Hilai and Nahshon ben Zadok, so he wasn't the author of the book.

According to most of the researchers, the book have been written in Babylon, but Prof. Avraham Grossman claims it was written in Ashkenaz by the second half of the 11th century, and his author may be Yaakov ben Yakar. He bases his claim on the following facts: 
 The book is mentioned only by rabbis from Germany and France
 Some of the ideas in the book are ideas written by early sages of Ashkenaz, like Meshullam ben Kalonymos and Meshullam ben rabbi Moshe.
 Some of the sources cited in the book don't align the Babylonian school of rabbis.
 Its writing style differs many times from the Babylonian writing style, especially using first-person singular, while Babylonian rabbis wrote in first-person plural.

References

Lost Jewish texts
Works of unknown authorship
Rabbinic legal texts and responsa
Jewish medieval literature
Sifrei Kodesh